Isolona dewevrei is a species of plant in the Annonaceae family. It is endemic to the Democratic Republic of the Congo.  It is threatened by habitat loss.

References

Flora of the Democratic Republic of the Congo
dewevrei
Vulnerable plants
Taxonomy articles created by Polbot
Taxa named by Émile Auguste Joseph De Wildeman
Taxa named by Théophile Alexis Durand